The Zambia Republican Party is a political party in Zambia.

History
The ZRP was formed in February 2001 as a merger of the Zambia Alliance for Progress (ZAP), the Republican Party and the National Republican Party; however, the ZAP later withdrew from the merger. In the December 2001 general elections it nominated Benjamin Mwila as its presidential candidate; Mwila finishing sixth in a field of eleven candidates with 5% of the vote. In the National Assembly elections the party received 6% of the vote, winning a single seat.

In June 2006 a faction of the party left to join the Movement for Multi-Party Democracy. In the build-up to the September 2006 general elections the ZRP joined the National Democratic Focus alliance. The NDF did not nominate a presidential candidate, but won a single seat in the National Assembly elections, taken by Mwila.

Prior to the 2011 general elections Mwila left to join the MMD.

References

Political parties in Zambia
Political parties established in 2001
2001 establishments in Zambia